Gibson Lake is an endorheic lake in geographic Macklem Township, in the city of Timmins, Cochrane District in Northeastern Ontario, Canada.

Gibson Lake is adjacent to the southeast. Gibson Lake Road travels south to the lake from Ontario Highway 101.

See also
List of lakes in Ontario

References

Other map sources:

Lakes of Cochrane District